Grand Ayatollah Asadollah Bayat-Zanjani is an Iranian theologian, Islamic philosopher, writer and Grand marja of Islam. He published his objection to the velayat-e faqih (religious system in Iran) and claims this regime has nothing to do with Islam.

Biography
Grand Ayatollah Zanjani studied religion in Zanjan and Qom and was promoted to 
degree of Ijtihad. Among his teachers were Allameh Tabatabaei, Morteza Motahhari, Ruhollah Khomeini, Ayatollah Araki and Golpaygani.

He is author of more than 10 books and is currently teaching Philosophy and religion in Qom Seminary.

Political career
Before the 1979 Iranian Revolution, Zanjani was a pro-democracy activist. In 1972, he was arrested and spent a year in prison. After the revolution, he was involved in the launching of the Islamic Republican Party. Zanjani was  also a member of the committee to reassess the Iranian constitution. He was elected three times to Iranian parliament where he represented the city of Zanjan.

Grand Ayatollah Zanjani was among the influential clerics who supported ex-prime minister Mousavi and questioned the legitimacy of Mahmoud Ahmadinejad's presidency.

In September 2022, following the death of Mahsa Amini in the custody of the Guidance Patrol, Zanjani said that the Guidance Patrol is “not only an illegal and anti-Islamic body, but also illogical. No part of our country’s laws assigns any mission or responsibility to this vigilante force,” and accused it of committing “repression and immoral acts.”

References

External links 
Grand Ayatollah Bayat-Zanjani's official website (in Persian)

Iranian reformists
Living people
People from Zanjan, Iran
1941 births
Association of Combatant Clerics politicians
Deputies of Mah Neshan and Ijrud
Deputies of Zanjan and Tarom
Members of the 1st Islamic Consultative Assembly
Members of the 2nd Islamic Consultative Assembly
Members of the 3rd Islamic Consultative Assembly
Second Deputies of Islamic Consultative Assembly
Assembly of Qom Seminary Scholars and Researchers members
Qom Seminary alumni
20th-century Iranian people
21st-century Iranian people